The James H. Laine Barn near Richfield, Idaho, United States, was built in 1910 by stonemason Jack Oughton and by Sandy Reed.  It was listed on the National Register of Historic Places in 1983.  The listing included a  area.

References

Barns on the National Register of Historic Places in Idaho
Buildings and structures completed in 1910
Buildings and structures in Lincoln County, Idaho
National Register of Historic Places in Lincoln County, Idaho